This is the first edition of this tournament. David Guez won the title, defeating Kenny de Schepper 6–2, 4–6, 7–6(7–5) in the final.

Seeds

Draw

Finals

Top half

Bottom half

References
Main Draw
Qualifying Draw

Open EuroEnergie de Quimper - Singles
2011 Singles